The Australian Journal of Management is a triannual peer-reviewed academic journal that covers research in accounting, applied economics, finance, industrial relations, political science, psychology, statistics, and other disciplines in relation to their application to management. The journal was established in 1976 and is published by SAGE Publications in association with the Australian School of Business. The editor-in-chief is Andrew Jackson (University of New South Wales). The founding editor was Ray J. Ball.

Abstracting and indexing 
The journal is abstracted and indexed in Scopus, the International Bibliography of the Social Sciences, and the Social Sciences Citation Index. According to the Journal Citation Reports, the journal has a 2019 impact factor of 1.183.

Editors 
The following persons have been editors-in-chief of the journal:
 Ray J. Ball
 Chris Adam
 John Conybeare
 Vic Taylor
 Phillip Yetton
 John Roberts
 Robert Marks
 Baljit Sidhu
 Jane Baxter

References

External links
 

Business and management journals
Publications established in 1976
English-language journals
SAGE Publishing academic journals
Triannual journals